The Erasto Gaertner Hospital is a health institution in Curitiba, in the Brazilian state of Paraná. It specializes in the clinical and surgical treatment of patients with oncological diseases.

History
On Saturday, 11 June 1955, the hospital's cornerstone was placed.

Before being officially inaugurated, patients with cancer were treated since 1970 when Paulo Pimentel, governor of Paraná State, donated a cobalt pump, that allowed 47 sessions of radiotherapy per day. The local community and volunteers gathered resources to finalize and effectively inaugurate the Erasto Gaertner Hospital, on Friday, 8 December 1972.

In the beginning, the Erasto Gaertner offered basic clinical and surgical care, attending few patients in an operating room, with a radiotherapy device and the cobalt pump.

Nowadays, the hospital is considered the largest cancer treatment center in South Brazil.

References

Hospitals in Curitiba